The Ministry of Economy and Finance (MOEF) oversees the financial policies of the South Korean government. It publishes a monthly report on the national economy, known as the "Green Book." The current minister is Choo Kyung-ho. The headquarters is in the Sejong Government Complex in Sejong City.

According to Chapter 3 Article 19 of the Government Organisation Act, the Minister of Economy and Finance also acts as the Deputy Prime Minister, together with the Minister for Education.

MOEF has enforcement functions as well. It oversees the National Tax Tribunal and the Financial Intelligence Unit.

The ministry was formed in 1994 through the merger of the old Economic Planning Board (est. 1961) and Ministry of Finance (est. 1948).

History
1948

Three years after gaining independence from Japan, the Korean government was set up and it established the Ministry of Finance and the Economic Planning Board. The Ministry of Finance took charge of designing tax, financial and monetary policies as well as managing state-owned property and exchange rates. On the other hand, the Economic Planning Board was empowered in 1961 and assumed an important mandate of designing 5 year economic development plans in addition to its usual functions such as managing the government's budget and securing foreign loans.

1994
 
As the need arose for an integrated approach to implement the government's functions on economic affairs in an efficient and coherent way, the Economic Planning Board and the Ministry of Finance was merged into the Ministry of Finance and Economy (MOFE).

1998
 
In a response to the financial crisis, the MOFE's functions were separated and transferred to other Ministries so as to mitigate the overconcentration of decision-making authority by MOFE. Its budgetary authority was transferred to the National Budget Administration, its financial supervision authority to the Financial Supervisory Commission, and its trade negotiating authority to the Ministry of Foreign Affairs and Trade.

1999

The Planning and Budget Commission and the National Budget Administration was merged into the Ministry of Planning and Budget (MPB).

2008
 
The Ministry of Finance and Economy (MOFE) and the Ministry of Planning and Budget (MPB) was again merged into the Ministry of Strategy and Finance (MOSF) in order to put under one roof fiscal policy functions and inter-ministerial policy coordination. On the other hand, the MOFE's authority on financial policies regarding the financial market was transferred to the Financial Services Commission. In 2018, the ministry changed its official English name to the Ministry of Economy and Finance.

Offices
Currently this Ministry is in Sejong Government Complex in Sejong City. Previously the office had its headquarters in the Government Complex Gwacheon, in Gwacheon, Gyeonggi Province.

Tasks
1. Planning and coordination of the mid- to long-term socio-economic development goals and setting economic policy direction on an annual basis

2. Distributing resources effectively and assessing the effectiveness of budget execution

3. Planning/reforming Korea's tax policy and system

4. Planning and management of policies for treasury, government properties, government accounting and the national debt

5. Coordination of policies for foreign currency transactions and international finance

6. Enhancement of international cooperation and promotion of inter-Korean economic exchanges and cooperation

7. Management and monitoring of public institutions' operation

Criticism
The Ministry of Economy and Finance was accused of releasing a comprehensive review on welfare-related campaign promises of each political party before the 2012 election.

List of Ministers

See also

Government of South Korea
Economy of South Korea
Korea Financial Investment Association
Financial Services Commission
Financial Supervisory Service
Bank of Korea
Statistics Korea

References

External links
Official English site
Official site 

Government ministries of South Korea
South Korea
South Korea
South Korea, Economy and Finance